This is a list of past cabinets in Malawi that preceded the current cabinet of Malawi.

Cabinet of 2014

Cabinet as of September 8, 2011
On 19 August 2011, President Bingu wa Mutharika sacked his 42-member cabinet and took over all portfolios until further notice. 
He announced a new trimmed down cabinet on September 7, 2011, which was to be sworn in on September 8, 2011.

Cabinet as of 19 August 2011

On 19 August 2011, President Bingu wa Mutharika sacked his 42-member cabinet and took over all portfolios until further notice. 
Vice President Joyce Banda constitutionally remained the country's vice president, although she was expelled from the ruling Democratic Progressive Party in December 2010 (See DPP Party cabinet).

Cabinet as of 9 August 2010

The cabinet announced on 9 August 2010 was as follows:

Cabinet as of 15 June 2009
The cabinet that became effective on 15 June 2009 was:

Cabinet as of November 2007
Key ministers as of November 2007 were:

Cabinet as of February 2005 
The cabinet that became effective in February 2005 was:

Cabinet as of June 2004 
The cabinet that became effective in June 2004 was:

References

Cabinet of Malawi